Huckleberry Finn is a 1975 American television film adaptation of Mark Twain's famous 1884 boyhood novel, Huckleberry Finn. The film stars Ron Howard as the eponymous lead.

Cast
 Ron Howard as Huckleberry Finn
 Donny Most as Tom Sawyer
 Royal Dano as Mark Twain
 Antonio Fargas as Jim
 Jack Elam as The King
 Merle Haggard as The Duke
 Rance Howard as Pap Finn
 Dee Carroll as Aunt Sally
 Clint Howard as Arch
 James Almanzar as Silas Phelps
 Jean Speegle Howard as Widow Douglas
 Bill Erwin as Harvey Wilkes

Filming locations
The film was shot in Missouri, in Arrow Rock, Lupus, and for exteriors, Colusa County, California.

Awards
The film won a 1976 Primetime Emmy Award for "Outstanding Children's Special", tying with You're a Good Sport, Charlie Brown.

See also
 List of American films of 1975
 List of films featuring slavery

References

External links
 

1975 films
1970s adventure films
American adventure films
Films based on Adventures of Huckleberry Finn
Films set in the 19th century
Films set in Missouri
Films shot in California
Films shot in Missouri
ABC Movie of the Week
Films directed by Robert Totten
Films scored by Earl Robinson
1970s English-language films
Television shows based on works by Mark Twain
1970s American films